The 1997–98 season of the Slovak Second Football League (also known as 2. liga) was the fifth season of the league since its establishment. It began on 3 August 1997 and ended on 13 June 1998.

League standing

See also
1997–98 Slovak Superliga

References
 Jindřich Horák, Lubomír Král: Encyklopedie našeho fotbalu, Libri 1997
 Igor Mráz: Päť rokov futbalu, SFZ 1998

2. Liga (Slovakia) seasons
2
Slovak